Convoy RA 55A was an Arctic convoy during World War II. 
It was one of a series of convoys run to return Allied ships from Soviet northern ports to ports in Britain.
It sailed in late December 1943, reaching British ports at the end of the month. All ships arrived safely.

Forces
RA 55A consisted of 23 merchant ships which departed from Kola Inlet on 22 December 1943.
Close escort was provided by the two destroyers, Westcott and Beagle, a minesweeper and three corvettes. 
There was also an Ocean escort, comprising the destroyer Milne (Capt. IMR Campbell commanding) and seven other Home Fleet destroyers. 
A cruiser cover force comprising Belfast (V.Adm R Burnett commanding), Norfolk, and Sheffield also followed the convoy from Murmansk, to guard against attack by surface units. 
Distant cover would be provided by a Heavy Cover Force comprising the battleship Duke of York, the cruiser Jamaica and four destroyers under the command of V Adm. Bruce Fraser, which at the time of RA 55A's departure was trailing the Murmansk-bound convoy JW 55B.

RA 55A was threatened by a U-boat force of eight boats in a patrol line, code-named Eisenbart, in the Norwegian Sea, and a surface force comprising the battleship Scharnhorst and five destroyers was also available, stationed at Altenfjord.

Action
RA 55A sailed from Kola with its escort on 22 December 1943, two days after JW 55B had sailed from Britain. 
The Admiralty were aware of the threat of a sortie by Scharnhorst and Adm Fraser was placed in overall command of the operation, co-ordinating the movements of both convoys and the various escort forces. 
On 25 December 1943 Fraser received intelligence that Scharnhorst had sailed; RA 55A was diverted north, to avoid detection, and later that day, was ordered to dispatch four of the supporting destroyers to reinforce JW 55B. 

RA 55A itself was not sighted by any Axis forces, and cleared the danger area without further incident.
It was met on 30 December 1943 by the western local escort, two minesweepers and two corvettes, and arrived safely at Loch Ewe on 1 January 1944.

Conclusion
The 23 ships of RA 55A arrived in Britain without loss, while the German attempt to attack the convoy had led to the loss of Scharnhorst, their last operational capital ship in Norway; an action in which RA 55A's escorting destroyers had played a significant role.

Ships involved

Allied ships

Merchant ships

 Arthur L Perry 
 Daniel Drake 
 Edmund Fanning 
 Empire Carpenter 
 Empire Celia 
 Empire Nigel 
 Fort McMurray 
 Fort Yukon 
 Gilbert Stuart 
 Henry Villard 
 James Smith 
 Junecrest  

 Mijdrecht 
 Ocean Strength 
 Ocean Vanity 
 Ocean Verity 
 Park Holland 
 Rathlin 
 San Adolfo 
 Thomas Kearns 
 Thomas Sim Lee 
 William L Marcy 
 William Windom 

 
Close escort
 Westcott 
Beagle  
Seagull 
Dianella 
Poppy
Acanthus
 
Ocean escort
 Milne (SOE)
 Meteor 
 Ashanti  
 Athabaskan 
 Matchless 
 Musketeer 
 Opportune 
 

 
Cruiser cover force
 Belfast (flag)
 Norfolk 
 Sheffield
 
Distant Cover Force
 Duke of York (flag)
 Jamaica 
Saumarez 
 Savage 
 Scorpion 
 Stord

Axis ships

 
U-boat force
  
 
 
 
 
 
 
Surface force
 Scharnhorst (flag) 
 Z29 
 Z30 
 Z33 
 Z34 
 Z38

Notes

References
 Clay Blair : Hitler's U-Boat War [Volume 2]: The Hunted 1942–1945 (1998)  (2000 UK paperback ed.)
 Paul Kemp : Convoy! Drama in Arctic Waters (1993) 
 Paul Kemp  : U-Boats Destroyed  ( 1997) .  
 Axel Neistle  : German U-Boat Losses during World War II  (1998). 
 Bob Ruegg, Arnold Hague : Convoys to Russia (1992) 
 Bernard Schofield : (1964) The Russian Convoys BT Batsford  ISBN (none)
  RA 55A at Convoyweb

RA 55A